Hynhamia lasgralariae is a species of moth of the family Tortricidae. It is found in Ecuador.

The wingspan is 15.5 mm for males and 16 mm for females. The ground colour of the forewings is cream, with brownish strigulae (fine streaks). The veins are suffused with brown and the terminal area is brownish. The markings are brownish. The hindwings are cream, in the distal third of the wing spotted with brownish grey. The apex is tinged with ochreous.

Etymology
The species name refers to the type locality, the Cloudforest Reserve Las Gralarias.

References

Hynhamia
Moths of South America
Endemic fauna of Ecuador
Moths described in 2007
Taxa named by Józef Razowski